Richard (died 1178) was a 12th-century bishop of Dunkeld. He got the bishopric of Dunkeld, the second most prestigious bishopric in Scotland-north-of-the-Forth, after serving the King of Scots. He was capellanus Regis Willelmi, that is, chaplain of King William I of Scotland, and had probably been the chaplain to William during the reign of King Malcolm IV. He was consecrated at St Andrews on 10 August 1170, by Richard, former chaplain of King Malcolm IV but now the bishop of St Andrews. Richard continued to have a close relationship with King William I, and was in Normandy with the king in December 1174 when the Treaty of Falaise was signed.

He died in 1178. He allegedly died at Cramond in Midlothian and was buried on Inchcolm. Both details may be the result of confusion with Richard de Prebenda, but burial on Inchcolm was common for the bishops of Dunkeld.

References

 Dowden, John, The Bishops of Scotland, ed. J. Maitland Thomson, (Glasgow, 1912)

External links
Dauvit Broun's list of 12th century Scottish Bishops

12th-century births
1178 deaths
Bishops of Dunkeld (pre-Reformation)
12th-century Scottish Roman Catholic bishops